KRVC (98.9 FM) is a radio station broadcasting a CHR/Pop format. Licensed to Hornbrook, California, United States, the station serves the Medford-Ashland area. The station is currently owned by Opus Broadcasting Systems, Inc.

Previous logo

References

External links

RVC
Contemporary hit radio stations in the United States
Mass media in Siskiyou County, California
RVC